Horace James Cohen (6 May 1906 – 14 March 1958) was an English athlete who competed for Great Britain in the 1928 Summer Olympics.

He died in Westminster.

In 1928 he finished 39th in the Olympic long jump event.

At the 1930 Empire Games he won the silver medal with the English relay team in the 4×110 yards competition. In the long jump contest he finished sixth.

External links
 sports-reference.com

1906 births
1958 deaths
English male sprinters
English male long jumpers
Olympic athletes of Great Britain
Athletes (track and field) at the 1928 Summer Olympics
Athletes (track and field) at the 1930 British Empire Games
Commonwealth Games silver medallists for England
Commonwealth Games medallists in athletics
Medallists at the 1930 British Empire Games